Yevhen Pavlovych Pobihushchyi-Ren (in Polish Jewhen Pawłowycz Pobihuszczy) (né Pobihushchyi; 15 November 1901 – 28 May 1995) was a Ukrainian military commander and Axis collaborator who served as commander of the Roland Battalion and Schutzmannschaft Battalion 201, and as one of the commanders of 14th Waffen Grenadier Division of the SS (1st Galician).

Early life and career 
At the age of 17, he joined the Ukrainian Galician Army following the founding of the West Ukrainian People's Republic, and participated in the Polish–Ukrainian War as an artilleryman. He returned home in May 1920 with the rank of senior corporal. 

Following the war, he joined Plast, and was arrested in 1920 for refusing to celebrate Polish independence. However, due to Polish opposition to Ukrainian-language education, he could not get a job and was conscripted into the Polish Armed Forces infantry in 1925. Beginning in 1928, he studied at the Adam Mickiewicz University in Poznań, eventually earning a doctorate in political economy. At this time, he also unsuccessfully sought a doctorate from the Ukrainian Free University, being rejected in part due to his alleged ties to the Organisation of Ukrainian Nationalists (OUN), a far-right political organisation advocating for Ukrainian independence from Poland.

World War II 
Following the invasion of Poland in 1939, Pobihushchyi fought against German forces and served at the Battle of the Bzura, taking over the Third Battalion of the  following the death of its commander, major Józef Kewpinski. Shortly before the end of the Battle of the Bzura, Pobihushchyi was captured on 17 September 1939, and interned with other ethnic Ukrainians and Georgians in Luckenwalde's Stalag III-A, near Berlin.

In the spring of 1940, Pobihushchyi, along with other Ukrainian prisoners of war, was released as part of a deal struck between OUN ideologue Dmytro Dontsov and the German government. Following his release, he initially studied the German language in Berlin. At the same time, he joined the Wehrmacht as a translator.

Roland Battalion and Schutzmannschaft Battalion 201 
In May 1941, Pobihushchyi moved to Vienna, where he trained soldiers as part of the  military organisation. The Wives of Ukrainian Nationalists was split into two battalions; the Nachtigall Battalion, led by Roman Shukhevych, and the Roland Battalion, under Pobihushchyi. In November 1941, the Nachtigall and Roland Battalions were transformed into Schutzmannschaft Battalion 201, which Pobihushchyi commanded. Schutzmannschaft Battalion 201 was active both in fighting the Belarusian partisans and killings of civilians, including Jews, though the role of the battalion in the Holocaust remains to be studied in depth.

Leadership of the 14th Division of the SS 
In January 1943, Schutzmannschaft Battalion 201 was disbanded for refusing to renew their contracts, and their leaders were detained in Lviv. While Shukhevych fled, Pobihushchyi remained imprisoned until Easter Saturday 1943, and was to be executed or sent to Majdanek concentration camp until , a Galician German, successfully negotiated his release in return for participation in the creation of the 14th Waffen Grenadier Division of the SS (1st Galician). Pobihushchyi was among the staff of the division until 1944. He later went on to refer to his time in imprisonment as "the worst period in [his] life."

Later life and death 
Following the end of World War II, Pobihushchyi found himself in the British occupation zone in Germany, and joined the British Army, overseeing the Ukrainian Guard Hundreds from 1954 to 1958. During this time, he also served as an organisational officer of the Ukrainian Red Cross Society in Germany and taught at Ukrainian displaced persons camps. At this time, he and his wife changed their surname from Pobihushchyi to Pobihushchyi-Ren, likely to avoid extradition to the Soviet Union. 

Pobihushchyi-Ren also worked with OUN leader Yaroslav Stetsko as part of the Anti-Bolshevik Bloc of Nations and was heavily active both in contributing to Ukrainian publishing and the Ukrainian Greek Catholic Church. The same year, Pobihushchyi-Ren published his memoirs, Mosaic of My Memories in London, and he also donated a portion of his library to the University of Lviv after Ukraine gained independence from the Soviet Union. 

Pobihushchyi-Ren died on 28 May 1995, in Haar, Bavaria, near Munich in Germany.

Notes

References 

1901 births
1995 deaths
Members of the Galizien division
Members of the Ukrainian Greek Catholic Church
People from Ternopil Oblast
Ukrainian Galician Army people